Stephanorrhina is a genus of the family Scarabaeidae, subfamily Cetoniinae and tribe Goliathini.

Description and Distribution
The basic colours of the species belonging to this genus vary  from purple to light-green, usually with bright white spots in the elytra. Usually males have two small and two large horns (sexual dimorphism). Life cycle  from egg to imago takes about six-eight months, with two-four months in cocoon stage. They are present in Malawi, Tanzania, Kenya, Uganda, SW Ethiopia and Cameroon.

List of species
 Stephanorrhina adelpha Kolbe, 1897
 Stephanorrhina bella (Waterhouse, 1879)
 Stephanorrhina guttata (Olivier, 1789)
 Stephanorrhina haroldi Kolbe, 1892
 Stephanorrhina isabellae Allard, 1990
 Stephanorrhina julia (Waterhouse, 1879)
 Stephanorrhina neumanni (Kolbe, 1897)
 Stephanorrhina princeps Oberthür, 1880
 Stephanorrhina simillima (Westwood, 1842)
 Stephanorrhina simplex Péringuey, 1907
 Stephanorrhina tibialis (Waterhouse, 1879)

References
 Biolib
Flower-beetles

Cetoniinae